Amplitude of Low Frequency Fluctuations (ALFF) and fractional Amplitude of Low Frequency Fluctuations (f/ALFF) are neuroimaging methods used to measure spontaneous fluctuations in BOLD-fMRI signal intensity for a given region in the resting brain. Electrophysiological studies suggest that low-frequency oscillations arise from spontaneous neuronal activity. Though ALFFs have been researched extensively in fMRI based theoretical models of brain function, their actual significance is still unknown.

Default mode network
Whole-brain ALFF shows greater signal in posterior cingulate, precuneus, and medial prefrontal areas of the default mode network, but also in non-cortical areas near the ventricles, cisterns and large blood vessels. f/ALFF reduces the sensitivity of ALFF to physiological noise by taking the ratio of each frequency (0.01-0.08 Hz) to the total frequency range (0-0.25 Hz). Both measures have been investigated as part of reliable biomarkers for many neurological conditions including schizophrenia, anorexia nervosa, and ADHD.

References

Magnetic resonance imaging
Medical imaging
Neuroscience